Hyperchiria is a genus of moths in the family Saturniidae first described by Jacob Hübner in 1819.

Species
The genus includes the following species:

Hyperchiria acuta (Conte, 1906)
Hyperchiria acutapex Brechlin & Meister, 2010
Hyperchiria aniris (Jordan, 1910)
Hyperchiria australoacuta Brechlin & Meister, 2010
Hyperchiria carabobensis Brechlin & Meister, 2010
Hyperchiria columbiana Brechlin & Meister, 2010
Hyperchiria cuscoincisoides Brechlin & Meister, 2010
Hyperchiria extremapex Brechlin & Meister, 2010
Hyperchiria guetemalensis Brechlin & Meister, 2010
Hyperchiria incisa Walker, 1855
Hyperchiria incisoides Brechlin & Meister, 2010
Hyperchiria jinotegaensis Brechlin & Meister, 2010
Hyperchiria meridaensis Brechlin & Meister, 2010
Hyperchiria misionincisoides Brechlin & Meister, 2010
Hyperchiria nausica (Cramer, 1779)
Hyperchiria nausioccidentalis Brechlin & Meister, 2010
Hyperchiria orodina (Schaus, 1906)
Hyperchiria plicata (Herrich-Schaeffer, 1855)
Hyperchiria sanjuensis Brechlin & Meister, 2010
Hyperchiria schmiti Meister & Storke, 2004

References

Hemileucinae